Millen is a city, and the county seat of Jenkins County, Georgia, United States. The population was 3,120 at the 2010 census, down from 3,492 at the 2000 census.

The city is intersected by U.S. Route 25 and State Route 17, and the proposed Interstate 3 will pass nearby.

History

Millen was first settled in 1835 along the border of what was then Burke and Screven counties. It was originally named "79" due to its approximate distance in miles from the coastal city of Savannah. Planters cultivated cotton as a commodity crop.

In 1854, the Central of Georgia Railway and the Georgia Railroad connected at 79. The town became known as "Millen's Junction" after McPherson B. Millen, the superintendent of the Central of Georgia Railway.

During the Civil War, a site for a prisoner-of-war camp to house Union soldiers was chosen about five miles from Millen's Junction. Camp Lawton included a hospital, fort and officer housing and had about 8,600 prisoners confined there on 14 November 1864, according to a detailed camp map made by a former prisoner. It was built in what is today Magnolia Springs State Park, because the location was favorable due to the springs providing potable water and its proximity to the Augusta and Savannah Railroad. On December 3, 1864, Sherman's March to the Sea passed through Millen. Prior to the arrival of Union forces, Confederate soldiers evacuated the Camp Lawton prisoners to Savannah. The Union soldiers destroyed Millen's Junction after finding the prison camp and to avoid use of the railway junction.

The town was rebuilt after the war. In 1881, the city of Millen was incorporated by an act of the Georgia State Legislature, becoming the county seat of the newly created Jenkins County in 1905. The summer of 1919 was called the Red Summer due to a number of race riots throughout America. Millen did not escape this and white mobs burned down and killed a number of people in Millen during the Jenkins County, Georgia, riot of 1919.

The Downtown Millen Historic District was listed on the National Register of Historic Places in 1996. The county is largely rural and agricultural.

Geography
Millen is the only incorporated municipality in Jenkins County. It is located on the east side of the Ogeechee River. U.S. Route 25 passes through the west side of the city, leading north  to Waynesboro and south  to Statesboro. Georgia State Route 17 passes through the center of the city, entering from the west as Winthrope Avenue and leaving to the south as Masonic Street. SR-17 leads northwest  to Louisville and southeast  to Savannah. State Route 21 bypasses Millen to the northeast, ending at US 25 at the northern city limit. SR-21 leads east  to Sylvania.

Demographics

2020 census

As of the 2020 United States census, there were 2,966 people, 1,113 households, and 563 families residing in the city.

2000 census
At the 2000 census there were 3,492 people in 1,321 households, including 854 families, in the city. The racial makup of the city was 59.31% African American, 37.92% White, 0.17% Asian, 0.17% Pacific Islander, 0.06% Native American, 1.35% from other races, and 1.03% from two or more races. Hispanic or Latino of any race were 2.86%.

Of the 1,321 households 30.8% had children under the age of 18 living with them, 32.9% were married couples living together, 27.6% had a female householder with no husband present, and 35.3% were non-families. 31.2% of households were one person and 14.4% were one person aged 65 or older. The average household size was 2.55 and the average family size was 3.24.

The age distribution was 28.4% under the age of 18, 9.3% from 18 to 24, 24.9% from 25 to 44, 20.9% from 45 to 64, and 16.6% 65 or older.  The median age was 36 years. For every 100 females, there were 80.7 males. For every 100 females age 18 and over, there were 74.7 males.

The median household income was $18,701 and the median family income  was $23,423. Males had a median income of $25,792 versus $17,330 for females. The per capita income for the city was $11,851, placing Millen among the poorest locations in the state. About 30.0% of families and 35.0% of the population were below the poverty line, including 45.2% of those under age 18 and 28.2% of those age 65 or over.

Education

Jenkins County School District 
The Jenkins County School District holds pre-school to grade twelve, and consists of one elementary school, one middle school, and one high school. The district has 119 full-time teachers and over 1,754 students.
Jenkins County Elementary School
Jenkins County Middle School
Jenkins County High School

Notable people
 Jim Busby, baseball player who retired to Millen after his coaching career was over.
 Nathan Deal, 82nd governor of Georgia, born in Millen
 Melvin E. Thompson, 71st governor of Georgia, born in Millen

See also

 Camp Lawton (Georgia)
National Register of Historic Places listings in Jenkins County, Georgia

References

External links
 
 The Millen News, the city's weekly newspaper

Cities in Georgia (U.S. state)
Cities in Jenkins County, Georgia
County seats in Georgia (U.S. state)